The IRFU Interprovincial Championship was an Irish Rugby Football Union competition run between the four provinces of Ireland - Ulster, Leinster, Munster and Connacht. The Irish Exiles took part for four years (1992–93 – 1995–96). The competition was run as a distinct competition from 1946–47 to 2000–01, with the 2001–02 fixtures being fulfilled by the match-ups in the newly formed Celtic League.

In addition to the official years of the competition, the unofficial Interpro records have been taken from the regular season domestic league matches between the provinces in the Celtic League now known as the United Rugby Championship. In recent years, the IRFU started a similar championship for 'A' squads, but these results are not included here. Since the inception of the United Rugby Championship in 2021, Irish teams now compete in a conference for the Irish Shield. However, unlike the Interprovincial Championship, these results include matches against non-Irish sides so it is not considered a continuation.

Roll of honour

 There were not a full set of matches to complete the competition in 2002–03.
 The rules for deciding placing used for the Celtic League/Magners League/Pro12 for that season were used to decide the placings in the interpro table.

2021–22 season (Leinster)

All-time league table
incl 2021/22. Updated at the end of season

All-time league table (official competition)
1946–2002

Assumes four points for a win, two for a draw. The use of bonus points only commenced in 1998–99.

League placings
1946–2020

League placings (official competition)
1946–2002

This is a simple count of the annual league placings, regardless of whether the top two or top three were considered joint winners. The "Total" column awards points where 1st = 5 points, 2nd = 4 points etc.

Tables by year

! colspan="9" width="150px" |

! colspan="9" width="150px" |

! colspan="9" width="305px" |

! colspan="9" width="305px" |

See also
 1872 Cup — Scottish club rivalry

References

Rugby union competitions in Ireland
Rugby union competitions in Europe for clubs and provinces